Rune Vindheim (born 15 May 1972) is a retired Norwegian football player who is currently the manager of Fana IL.

Player career
While playing for Fana IL, he was sold to Burnley in 1998, playing eight league games, one FA Cup game and one Football League Trophy game. He was then sold to Hartlepool United in 1999, playing seven league games and one FA Cup game.

Managing career
Vindheim became assistant coach of Fana IL ahead of the 2010 season. The season ended with relegation, and he was promoted to head coach. Vindheim and Fana subsequently won promotion from the 2011 Norwegian Third Division.

References

1972 births
Living people
People from Høyanger
Norwegian footballers
SK Brann players
Åsane Fotball players
Sogndal Fotball players
Fana IL players
Burnley F.C. players
Hartlepool United F.C. players
Expatriate footballers in England
Norwegian expatriate footballers
Norwegian football managers
Association football defenders
Sportspeople from Vestland